Jack W Webster (1917 – 6 February 2005) was an Australian rower. He competed in the men's coxed four event at the 1948 Summer Olympics.

References

1917 births
2005 deaths
Australian male rowers
Olympic rowers of Australia
Rowers at the 1948 Summer Olympics
Place of birth missing
Commonwealth Games medallists in rowing
Rowers at the 1950 British Empire Games
Commonwealth Games gold medallists for Australia
Medallists at the 1950 British Empire Games
20th-century Australian people